Neotrachystola maculipennis is a species of beetle in the family Cerambycidae, and the only species in the genus Neotrachystola. It was described by Fairmaire in 1900.

References

Phrissomini
Beetles described in 1900